A flag is a piece of fabric (most often rectangular or quadrilateral) with a distinctive design and colours. It is used as a symbol, a signalling device, or for decoration. The term flag is also used to refer to the graphic design employed, and flags have evolved into a general tool for rudimentary signalling and identification, especially in environments where communication is challenging (such as the maritime environment, where semaphore is used). Many flags fall into groups of similar designs called flag families. The study of flags is known as "vexillology" from the Latin , meaning "flag" or "banner".

National flags are patriotic symbols with widely varied interpretations that often include strong military associations because of their original and ongoing use for that purpose. Flags are also used in messaging, advertising, or for decorative purposes.

Some military units are called "flags" after their use of flags. A flag is equivalent to a brigade in Arab countries. In Spain, a flag is a battalion-equivalent in the Spanish Legion.

History

The origin of the flag is unknown and it remains unclear when the first flag was raised.
Ships with vexilloids were represented on predynastic Egyptian pottery . In antiquity, field signs or standards that can be categorised as vexilloid or "flag-like" were used in warfare, which originated in ancient Egypt or Assyria. Examples include the Sassanid battle standard Derafsh Kaviani, and the standards of the Roman legions such as the eagle of Augustus Caesar's Xth legion and the dragon standard of the Sarmatians; the latter was allowed to fly freely in the wind, carried by a horseman, but depictions suggest that it bore more similarity to an elongated dragon kite than to a simple flag.

It features a seated man and a kneeling woman facing each other, with a star in between. This iconography can be found in other Bronze Age pieces of art in the area as well.

Flags as recognized today, made of a piece of cloth representing a particular entity, were almost certainly the invention of the ancient peoples of the Indian subcontinent or the Zhou dynasty of Ancient China. Chinese flags had devices such as a red bird, a white tiger, or a blue dragon, and royal flags were to be treated with a level of respect similar to that given to the ruler. Indian flags were often triangular and decorated with attachments such as a yak's tail and the state umbrella. Silk flags spread to the Near East from China or it was simply the silk which made the journey to be fashioned by people who had independently arrived at the idea of rectangle clothed attached to a pole. Flags were probably transmitted to Europe via the Muslim world, where plainly coloured flags were being used due to Islamic proscriptions. They are often mentioned in the early history of Islam and may have been copied from India.

In Europe, during the High Middle Ages, flags came to be used primarily as a heraldic device in battle, allowing more easily to identify a knight than only from the heraldic device painted on the shield. Already during the high medieval period, and increasingly during the Late Middle Ages, city states and communes such as those of the Old Swiss Confederacy also began to use flags as field signs. Regimental flags for individual units became commonplace during the Early Modern period.

During the peak of the age of sail, beginning in the early 17th century, it was customary (and later a legal requirement) for ships to fly flags designating their nationality; these flags eventually evolved into the national flags and maritime flags of today. Flags also became the preferred means of communications at sea, resulting in various systems of flag signals; see, International maritime signal flags.

Use of flags outside of military or naval context begins only with the rise of nationalist sentiment by the end of the 18th century, although some flags date back earlier. The flags of countries such as Austria, Denmark or Turkey emerged from the midst of legend while many others, including those of Poland and Switzerland, grew out of the heraldic emblems of the Middle Ages. The 17th century saw the birth of several national flags through revolutionary struggle. One of these was the flag of the Netherlands, which appeared during the 80-year Dutch rebellion which began in 1568 against Spanish domination.

Political change and social reform, allied to a growing sense of nationhood among ordinary people, led to the birth of new nations and flags all over the world in the 19th and 20th centuries.

National flags

One of the most popular uses of a flag is to symbolise a nation or country. Some national flags have been particularly inspirational to other nations, countries, or subnational entities in the design of their own flags. Some prominent examples include:

 The flag of Denmark, the Dannebrog, is attested in 1478, and is the oldest national flag still in use. It inspired the cross design of the other Nordic countries: Norway, Sweden, Iceland, Finland, and regional Scandinavian flags for the Faroe Islands, Åland, Scania and Bornholm, as well as flags for the non-Scandinavian Shetland and Orkney.
 The flag of the Netherlands is the oldest tricolour. Its three colours of red, white and blue go back to Charlemagne's time, the ninth century. The coastal region of what today is the Netherlands was then known for its cloth in these colours. Maps from the early 16th century already put flags in these colours next to this region, like Texeira's map of 1520. A century before that, during the 15th century, the three colours were mentioned as the coastal signals for this area, with the three bands straight or diagonal, single or doubled. As state flag it first appeared around 1572 as the Prince's Flag in orange–white–blue. Soon the more famous red–white–blue began appearing, becoming the prevalent version from around 1630. Orange made a comeback during the civil war of the late 18th century, signifying the orangist or pro-stadtholder party. During World War II the pro-Nazi NSB used it. Any symbolism has been added later to the three colours, although the orange comes from the House of Orange-Nassau. This use of orange comes from Nassau, which today uses orange-blue, not from Orange, which today uses red-blue. However, the usual way to show the link with the House of Orange-Nassau is the orange pennant above the red-white-blue.  It is said that the Dutch Tricolour has inspired many flags but most notably those of Russia, New York City, and South Africa (the 1928–94 flag as well the current flag).  As the probable inspiration for the Russian flag, it is the source too for the pan-Slavic colours red, white and blue, adopted by many Slavic states and peoples as their symbols; examples are Slovakia, Serbia, and Slovenia.
 The national flag of France was designed in 1794. As a forerunner of revolution, France's tricolour flag style has been adopted by other nations. Examples: Italy, Belgium, Ireland, Romania and Mexico.
 The Union Flag (Union Jack) of the United Kingdom is the most commonly used. British colonies typically flew a flag based on one of the ensigns based on this flag, and many former colonies have retained the design to acknowledge their cultural history. Examples: Australia, Fiji, New Zealand, Tuvalu, and also the Canadian provinces of Manitoba, Ontario and British Columbia, and the American state of Hawaii; see commons:Flags based on British ensigns.
 The flag of the United States is nicknamed The Stars and Stripes or Old Glory. Some nations imitated this flag to symbolise their similarity to the United States and/or the American Revolution. Examples: Liberia, Chile, Taiwan (ROC), and the French region of Brittany.

 Ethiopia was seen as a model by emerging African states of the 1950s and 1960s, as it was one of the oldest independent states in Africa. Accordingly, its flag became the source of the Pan-African colours, or 'Rasta colours'. Examples: Benin, Togo, Senegal, Ghana, Mali, Guinea.
 The flag of Turkey, which is very similar to the last flag of the old Ottoman Empire, has been an inspiration for the flag designs of many other Muslim nations. During the time of the Ottomans the crescent began to be associated with Islam and this is reflected on the flags of Algeria, Azerbaijan, Comoros, Libya, Mauritania, Pakistan, Tunisia and Maldives
 The Pan-Arab colours, green, white, red and black, are derived from the flag of the Great Arab Revolt as seen on the flags of Jordan, Libya, Kuwait, Sudan, Syria, the United Arab Emirates, Western Sahara, Egypt, Iraq, Yemen and Palestine.
 The Soviet flag, with its golden symbols of the hammer and sickle on a red field, was an inspiration to flags of other communist states, such as East Germany, People's Republic of China, Vietnam, Angola, Afghanistan (1978–1980) and Mozambique.
 The flag of Venezuela, created by Francisco de Miranda to represent the independence movement in Venezuela that later gave birth to the Gran Colombia, inspired the flags of Colombia, Ecuador, and the Federal Territories in Malaysia, all sharing three bands of yellow, blue and red with the flag of Venezuela.
 The flag of Argentina, created by Manuel Belgrano during the war of independence, was the inspiration for the United Provinces of Central America's flag, which in turn was the origin for the flags of Guatemala, Honduras, El Salvador, and Nicaragua.

National flag designs are often used to signify nationality in other forms, such as flag patches.

Civil flags

A civil flag is a version of the national flag that is flown by civilians on non-government installations or craft. The use of civil flags was more common in the past, in order to denote buildings or ships that were not crewed by the military. In some countries the civil flag is the same as the war flag or state flag, but without the coat of arms, such as in the case of Spain, and in others it's an alteration of the war flag.

War flags

Several countries, including the British Army and the Royal Navy (White Ensign) of the United Kingdom (Great Britain) and the Soviet Union have had unique flags flown by their armed forces separately, rather than the national flag.

Other countries' armed forces (such as those of the United States or Switzerland) use their standard national flag; in addition, the U.S. has alongside flags and seals designed from long tradition for each of its six uniformed military services/military sub-departments in the Department of Defense and the Department of Homeland Security. The Philippines' armed forces may use their standard national flag, but during times of war the flag is turned upside down. Bulgaria's flag is also turned upside down during times of war. These are also considered war flags, though the terminology only applies to the flag's military usage.

Large versions of the war flag flown on the warships of countries' navies are known as battle ensigns. In addition, besides flying the national standard or a military services' emblem flag at a military fort, base, station or post and at sea at the stern (rear) or main top mast of a warship, a Naval Jack flag and other maritime flags, pennants and emblems are flown at the bow (front). In times of war waving a white flag is a banner of truce, talks/negotiations or surrender.

Four distinctive African flags currently in the collection of the National Maritime Museum in Britain were flown in action by Itsekiri ships under the control of Nana Olomu during the conflict in the late 19th century. One is the flag generally known as the Benin Empire flag and one is referred to as Nana Olomu's flag.

International flags

Among international flags are the United Nations, Olympic, NATO and Paralympic flags.

Maritime flags

Flags are particularly important at sea, where they can mean the difference between life and death, and consequently where the rules and regulations for the flying of flags are strictly enforced. A national flag flown at sea is known as an ensign. A courteous, peaceable merchant ship or yacht customarily flies its ensign (in the usual ensign position), together with the flag of whatever nation it is currently visiting at the mast (known as a courtesy flag). To fly one's ensign alone in foreign waters, a foreign port or in the face of a foreign warship traditionally indicates a willingness to fight, with cannon, for the right to do so. , this custom is still taken seriously by many naval and port authorities and is readily enforced in many parts of the world by boarding, confiscation and other civil penalties. In some countries yacht ensigns are different from merchant ensigns in order to signal that the yacht is not carrying cargo that requires a customs declaration. Carrying commercial cargo on a boat with a yacht ensign is deemed to be smuggling in many jurisdictions. Traditionally, a vessel flying under the courtesy flag of a specific nation, regardless of the vessel's country of registry, is considered to be operating under the law of her 'host' nation.

There is a system of international maritime signal flags for numerals and letters of the alphabet. Each flag or pennant has a specific meaning when flown individually. As well, semaphore flags can be used to communicate on an ad hoc basis from ship to ship over short distances.

Another category of maritime flag flown by some United States government ships is the distinctive mark. Although the United States Coast Guard has its own service ensign, all other U.S. government ships fly the national ensign their service ensign, following United States Navy practice. To distinguish themselves from ships of the Navy, such ships historically have flown their parent organisation's flag from a forward mast as a distinctive mark. Today, for example, commissioned ships of the National Oceanic and Atmospheric Administration (NOAA) fly the NOAA flag as a distinctive mark.

Shapes and designs

Flags are usually rectangular in shape (often in the ratio 2:3, 1:2, or 3:5), but may be of any shape or size that is practical for flying, including square, triangular, or swallow tailed. A more unusual flag shape is that of the flag of Nepal, which is in the shape of two stacked triangles. Other unusually shaped flags include the civil flags of Ohio (a swallowtail); Tampa, Florida; and Pike County, Ohio.

Many flags are dyed through and through to be inexpensive to manufacture, such that the reverse side is the mirror image of the obverse (front) side, generally the side displayed when, from the observer's point of view, the flag flies from pole-side left to right. This presents two possibilities:

 If the design is symmetrical in an axis parallel to the flag pole, obverse and reverse will be identical despite the mirror-reversal, such as the Indian Flag or Canadian Flag
 If not, the obverse and reverse will present two variants of the same design, one with the hoist on the left (usually considered the obverse side), the other with the hoist on the right (usually considered the reverse side of the flag). This is very common and usually not disturbing if there is no text in the design.

Some complex flag designs are not intended to be shown on both sides, requiring separate obverse and reverse sides if made correctly. In these cases there is a design element (usually text) which is not symmetric and should be read in the same direction, regardless of whether the hoist is to the viewer's left or right. These cases can be divided into two types:

 The same (asymmetric) design may be duplicated on both sides. Such flags can be manufactured by creating two identical through and through flags and then sewing them back to back, though this can affect the resulting combination's responsiveness to the wind. Depictions of such flags may be marked with the symbol , indicating the reverse is congruent to (rather than a mirror image of) the obverse.
 Rarely, the reverse design may differ, in whole or in part, from that of the obverse. Examples of flags whose reverse differs from the obverse include the flag of Paraguay, the flag of Oregon, and the historical flag of the Soviet Union. Depictions of such flags may be marked with the symbol .

Common designs on flags include crosses, stripes, and divisions of the surface, or field, into bands or quarters—patterns and principles mainly derived from heraldry. A heraldic coat of arms may also be flown as a banner of arms, as is done on both the state flag of Maryland and the flag of Kiribati.

The de jure flag of Libya under Muammar Gaddafi, which consisted of a rectangular field of green, was for a long period the only national flag using a single colour and no design or insignia. However, other historical states have also used flags without designs or insignia, such as the short-lived Soviet Republic of Hungary and the more recent Sultanate of Muscat and Oman, whose flags were both a plain field of red.

Colours are normally described with common names, such as "red", but may be further specified using colourimetry.

The largest flag flown from a flagpole worldwide, according to Guinness World Records, is the flag of the United Arab Emirates flown in Sharjah.

Parts of a flag

The general parts of a flag are: canton (the upper inner section of the flag), field or ground (the entire flag except the canton), the hoist (the edge used to attach the flag to the hoist), and the fly (the furthest edge from the hoist end).

Vertical flags
Vertical flags are sometimes used in lieu of the standard horizontal flag in central and eastern Europe, particularly in the German-speaking countries. This practice came about because the relatively brisk wind needed to display horizontal flags is not common in these countries.

The standard horizontal flag (no. 1 in the preceding illustration) is nonetheless the form most often used even in these countries.

The vertical flag (German: Hochformatflagge or Knatterflagge; no. 2) is a vertical form of the standard flag. The flag's design may remain unchanged (No. 2a) or it may change, e.g. by changing horizontal stripes to vertical ones (no. 2b). If the flag carries an emblem, it may remain centred or may be shifted slightly upwards.

The vertical flag for hoisting from a beam (German: Auslegerflagge or Galgenflagge; no. 3) is additionally attached to a horizontal beam, ensuring that it is fully displayed even if there is no wind.

The vertical flag for hoisting from a horizontal pole (German: Hängeflagge; no. 4) is hoisted from a horizontal pole, normally attached to a building. The topmost stripe on the horizontal version of the flag faces away from the building.

The vertical flag for hoisting from a crossbar or banner (German: Bannerflagge; no. 5) is firmly attached to a horizontal crossbar from which it is hoisted, either by a vertical pole (no. 5a) or a horizontal one (no. 5b). The topmost stripe on the horizontal version of the flag normally faces to the left.

Religious flags

Flags can play many different roles in religion. In Buddhism, prayer flags are used, usually in sets of five differently coloured flags. Several flags and banners including the Black Standard are associated with Islam. Many national flags and other flags include religious symbols such as the cross, the crescent, or a reference to a patron saint. Flags are also adopted by religious groups and flags such as the Jain flag, Nishan Sahib (Sikhism), the Saffron flag (Hindu) and the Christian flag are used to represent a whole religion.

In sports
Because of their ease of signalling and identification, flags are often used in sports.

 In association football, linesmen carry small flags along the touch lines. They use the flags to indicate to the referee potential infringements of the laws, or who is entitled to possession of the ball that has gone out of the field of play, or, most famously, raising the flag to indicate an offside offence. Officials called touch judges use flags for similar purposes in both codes of rugby.
 In American and Canadian football, referees use penalty flags to indicate that a foul has been committed in game play. The phrase used for such an indication is flag on the play. The flag itself is a small, weighted handkerchief, tossed on the field at the approximate point of the infraction; the intent is usually to sort out the details after the current play from scrimmage has concluded. In American football, the flag is usually yellow; in Canadian football, it is usually orange.  In the National Football League, coaches also use red challenge flags to indicate that they wish to contest a ruling on the field.
 In yacht racing, flags are used to communicate information from the race committee boat to the racers. Different flags hoisted from the committee boat may communicate a false start, changes in the course, a cancelled race, or other important information. Racing boats themselves may also use flags to symbolise a protest or distress. The flags are often part of the nautical alphabetic system of International maritime signal flags, in which 26 different flags designate the 26 letters of the Latin alphabet.

 In auto and motorcycle racing, racing flags are used to communicate with drivers. Most famously, a checkered flag of black and white squares indicates the end of the race, and victory for the leader. A yellow flag is used to indicate caution requiring slow speed and a red flag requires racers to stop immediately. A black flag is used to indicate penalties.

 In addition, fans of almost all sports wave flags in the stands to indicate their support for the participants. Many sports teams have their own flags, and, in individual sports, fans will indicate their support for a player by waving the flag of his or her home country.
 Capture the flag is a popular children's sport.
 In Gaelic football and Hurling a green flag is used to indicate a goal while a white flag is used to indicate a point
 In Australian rules football, the goal umpire will wave two flags to indicate a goal (worth six points) and a single flag to indicate a behind (worth one point).
 For safety, dive flags indicate the locations of underwater scuba divers or that diving operations are being conducted in the vicinity.
 In water sports such as wakeboarding and Water-Skiing, an orange flag is held in between runs to indicate someone is in the water.
 In golf, the hole is almost always marked with a flag. The flagpole is designed to fit centered within the base of the hole and is removable.  Many courses will use colour-coded flags to determine a hole location at the front, middle or rear of the green.  However colour-coded flags are not used in the professional tours. (A rare example of a golf course that does not use flags to mark the hole is the East Course of Merion Golf Club, which instead uses flagpoles topped by wicker baskets.)
 Flag poles with flags of all shapes and sizes are used by marching bands, drum corps, and winter guard teams use flags as a method of visual enhancement in performances.

Diplomatic flags

Some countries use diplomatic flags, such as the United Kingdom (see image of the Embassy flag) and the Kingdom of Thailand (see image of the Embassy flag).

The socialist movement uses red flags to represent their cause. The anarchist movement has a variety of different flags, but the primary flag associated with them is the black flag. In the Spanish civil war, the anarchists used the red-and-black bisected flag. In the 20th century, the rainbow flag was adopted as a symbol of the LGBT social movements. Its derivatives include the Bisexual pride and Transgender pride flags.

Some of these political flags have become national flags, such as the red flag of the Soviet Union and national socialist banners for Nazi Germany. The present Flag of Portugal is based on what had been the political flag of the Portuguese Republican Party previous to the 5 October 1910 revolution which brought this party to power.

Personal flags

Throughout history, monarchs have often had personal flags (including royal standards), representing the royal person, including in personal union of national monarchies.

Vehicle flags
Flags are often representative of an individual's affinity or allegiance to a country, team or business and can be presented in various ways. A popular trend that has surfaced revolves around the idea of the 'mobile' flag in which an individual displays their particular flag of choice on their vehicle. These items are commonly referred to as car flags and are usually manufactured from high strength polyester material and are attached to a vehicle via a polypropylene pole and clip window attachment.

Swimming flags

In Australia, Canada, New Zealand, the Philippines, Ireland and the United Kingdom, a pair of red-yellow flags is used to mark the limits of the bathing area on a beach, usually guarded by surf lifesavers. If the beach is closed, the poles of the flags are crossed. The flags are coloured with a red triangle and a yellow triangle making a rectangular flag, or a red rectangle over a yellow rectangle. On many Australian beaches there is a slight variation with beach condition signalling. A red flag signifies a closed beach (in the UK also other dangers), yellow signifies strong current or difficult swimming conditions, and green represents a beach safe for general swimming. In Ireland, a red and yellow flag indicates that it is safe to swim; a red flag that it is unsafe; and no flag indicates that there are no lifeguards on duty. Blue flags may also be used away from the yellow-red lifesaver area to designate a zone for surfboarding and other small, non-motorised watercraft.

Reasons for closing the beach include:

 dangerous rip
 hurricane warning
 no lifeguards in attendance
 overpolluted water
 sharks
 tsunami
 waves too strong

A surf flag exists, divided into four quadrants. The top left and bottom right quadrants are black, and the remaining area is white.

Signal flag "India" (a black circle on a yellow square) is frequently used to denote a "blackball" zone where surfboards cannot be used but other water activities are permitted.

Railway flags
Railways use a number of coloured flags. When used as wayside signals they usually use the following meanings (exact meanings are set by the individual railroad company):

 red = stop
 yellow = proceed with care
 green or white = proceed.
 a flag of any colour waved vigorously means stop
 a blue flag on the side of a locomotive means that it should not be moved because someone is working on it (or on the train attached to it). A blue flag on a track means that nothing on that track should be moved. The flag can only be removed by the person or group that placed it. In the railway dominated steel industry this principle of "blue flag and tag" was extended to all operations at Bethlehem Steel, Lackawanna, New York. If a man went inside a large machine or worked on an electrical circuit for example, his blue flag and tag was sacrosanct.  The "Lock Out/Tag Out" practice is similar and now used in other industries to comply with safety regulations.

At night, the flags are replaced with lanterns showing the same colours.

Flags displayed on the front of a moving locomotive are an acceptable replacement for classification lights and usually have the following meanings (exact meanings are set by the individual railroad company):

 white = extra (not on the timetable)
 green = another section following
 red = last section

Additionally, a railroad brakeman will typically carry a red flag to make his or her hand signals more visible to the engineer. Railway signals are a development of railway flags.

Flagpoles

A flagpole, flagmast, flagstaff, or staff can be a simple support made of wood or metal. If it is taller than can be easily reached to raise the flag, a cord is used, looping around a pulley at the top of the pole with the ends tied at the bottom. The flag is fixed to one lower end of the cord, and is then raised by pulling on the other end. The cord is then tightened and tied to the pole at the bottom. The pole is usually topped by a flat plate or ball called a "truck" (originally meant to keep a wooden pole from splitting) or a finial in a more complex shape. Very high flagpoles may require more complex support structures than a simple pole, such as a guyed mast.

Dwajasthambam are flagpoles commonly found at the entrances of South Indian Hindu temples.

Record heights

The flagpole in North Korea is the fourth tallest flagpole in the world, however, it is not free-standing. It is a radio tower supported flagpole.

The current tallest flagpole in India (and the tallest flying the tricolour) is the  flagpole in Belgaum, Karnataka which was first hoisted on 12 March 2018. The tallest flagpole in the United Kingdom from 1959 until 2013 stood in Kew Gardens.

The current tallest flagpole in the United States (and the tallest flying an American flag) is the  pole completed before Memorial Day 2014 and custom-made with an  base in concrete by wind turbine manufacturer Broadwind Energy. It is situated on the north side of the Acuity Insurance headquarters campus along Interstate 43 in Sheboygan, Wisconsin, and is visible from Cedar Grove. The pole can fly a 220-pound flag for in light wind conditions and a heavier 350-pound flag in higher wind conditions.

Design
Flagpoles can be designed in one piece with a taper (typically a steel taper or a Greek entasis taper), or be made from multiple pieces to make them able to expand. In the United States, ANSI/NAAMM guide specification FP-1001-97 covers the engineering design of metal flagpoles to ensure safety.

Hoisting the flag
Hoisting the flag is the act of raising the flag on the flagpole. Raising or lowering flags, especially national flags, usually involves ceremonies and certain sets of rules, depending on the country, and usually involve the performance of a national anthem.

A flag-raising squad is a group of people, usually troops, cadets, or students, that march in and bring the flags for the flag-hoisting ceremony. Flag-hoisting ceremonies involving flag-raising squads can be simple or elaborate, involving large numbers of squads. Elaborate flag-hoisting ceremonies are usually performed on national holidays.

The cord or rope that ties a flag to its pole is called a halyard. Flags may have a strip of fabric along the hoist side called a heading for the halyard to pass through, or a pair of grommets for the halyard to be threaded through. Flags may also be held in position using Inglefield clips.

Flags in communication

Semaphore is a form of communication that utilises flags. The signalling is performed by an individual using two flags (or lighted wands), the positions of the flags indicating a symbol. The person who holds the flags is known as the signalman. This form of communication is primarily used by naval signallers. This technique of signalling was adopted in the early 19th century and is still used in various forms today.

The colours of the flags can also be used to communicate. For example; a white flag means, among other things, surrender or peace, a red flag can be used as a warning signal, and a black flag can mean war, or determination to defeat enemies.

Orientation of a flag is also used for communication, though the practice is rarely used given modern communication systems. Raising a flag upside-down was indicative that the raising force controlled that particular area, but that it was in severe distress.

See also
Lists and galleries of flags
 Gallery of sovereign state flags
 List of flag names
 Lists of flags
 Timeline of national flags
 Unofficial flags

Notable flag-related topics
 Flag families
 False flag
 Flag Day
 Flag desecration
 Flag protocol
 Flag patch
 Flag semaphore
 Flag throwing
 Glossary of vexillology
 Pledge of Allegiance (United States)
 Standard-bearer (also enumerates various types of standards, both flag types and immobile ensigns)
 Vexillology
 Flags of the World, an Internet-based vexillological association and resource
 Windsock

Citations

General and cited references 
Inglefield, Eric (1979 edition). Flags. Ward Lock, London.

External links

 International Marine Signal Flags

 
Articles containing video clips
National symbols
Vexillology